Terijoki Yacht club is located in Zelenogorsk, Russia, in # 1 Gavannaja street. 

There was a scandal in connection with 60 fire safety infractions leading to the temporary closing of the Club for 30 days in 2009 Since then, club has remained opened.

References 

Yacht clubs in Russia